De frente al sol, is a Mexican telenovela produced by Carla Estrada for Televisa in 1992.

María Sorté, Alfredo Adame and Angélica Aragón star as the main protagonists.

Cast 
María Sorté as Alicia Sandoval
Alfredo Adame as Eduardo
Angélica Aragón as Chole
Lilia Aragón as Ofelia
Itatí Cantoral as Lupita
Ada Carrasco as Lich
Miguel Córcega as Hernán
Leonardo Daniel as Young Adrián Bermúdez
Eric del Castillo as Daniel
Carlos Giron as Carlos
Sergio Kleiner as Adrián
Ariel López Padilla as Juan Carlos
Mónica Miguel as Amaranta
José Elías Moreno as Morán Mariño
René Muñoz as Quijano
Maritza Olivares as Elena
Arcelia Ramírez as Carolina
Eduardo Santamarina as Luis Enrique
Anna Silvetti as Noemí
Mauricio Achar as Alex
Romina Castro as Tina
Lupita Lara as Úrsula
Alejandra Maldonado as Sara

Sequel 
In 1993 Televisa made a sequel to this telenovela, entitled Más allá del puente starring only by María Sorté and Alfredo Adame.

References

External links 

1992 telenovelas
1992 Mexican television series debuts
1992 Mexican television series endings
Mexican telenovelas
Televisa telenovelas
Spanish-language telenovelas